The Ministry of Education, University and Research (in  or MIUR) is the ministry of the Italian government for the national education system, the Italian universities and research agencies.  The current Italian Minister of Public Education is Giuseppe Valditara and the Italian Minister of University and Research is Maria Cristina Messa.

History
In 1988, the Ministry of University and Research was split off from the Ministry of Public Education. In the first Prodi cabinet the two were merged back into the Ministry of Education, University and Scientific and Technological Research, then as the Ministry of Education, University and Research (MIUR) in the second and third Berlusconi cabinets. The two were re-separated in the second Prodi cabinet of 17 May 2006, but then re-merged in the fourth Berlusconi cabinet of 7 May 2008.

In 2019 the ministry drafted a policy combining evaluation of grants to research institutions with a requirement to publish research outputs in open access mode.

Structure

National level
Department for ministerial planning and for ministerial management of the education budget, human resources and information 
Department for education 
Department for the universities, higher education establishments in art, music and dance,

The three Departments carry out policies dictated by the Ministry and form the body which directs and programs educational policy.

Local level
Regional education "uffici", which are autonomous administrative centres, carrying out the instructions of the Departments, directly supporting individual schools, and articulating the policies on the ground.

Ministers

Since 2001

References

External links

Official site of the Ministero della Pubblica Istruzione
Ministry's official forum

Government ministries of Italy
Italy